Vriesea jonghei is a plant species in the genus Vriesea. This species is an epiphyte native to Brazil, French Guiana, and Trinidad & Tobago.

Cultivars
 Vriesea 'Flammea'
 Vriesea 'Van Ackeri'

References

jonghei
Flora of Brazil
Flora of French Guiana
Flora of Trinidad and Tobago
Epiphytes
Plants described in 1868